Louis Adolf Peter, 1st Prince of Sayn-Wittgenstein-Ludwigsburg-Berleburg (– 11 June 1843), better known as Peter Wittgenstein in English, was a Prince of the German dynasty Sayn-Wittgenstein and Field Marshal in the Imperial Russian Army during the Napoleonic wars.

Early life
Born Ludwig Adolf Peter Graf zu Sayn-Wittgenstein-Ludwigsburg-Berleburg, he was descended from a family of ruling German Counts whose seat was in Berleburg (present day North Rhine-Westphalia, Germany). His parents were Count Christian Louis Casimir of Sayn-Wittgenstein-Ludwigsburg and his first 
wife Countess Amalie Ludowika Finck von Finckenstein.

Military career
Enrolled as a sergeant in the Semyonovsky Regiment of the Imperial Russian Army at the age of 12 in 1781, Wittgenstein began actual military service as a Wachtmeister in the Life Guard Horse Regiment in 1789. In 1793 he gained promotion to Major in the Ukrainian light cavalry regiment.  He fought with the unit in the Kościuszko Uprising of 1794.  Promoted to the rank of colonel in 1798, and to major general in 1799, in 1800 he took command of the Mariupolski Hussars Regiment.

In 1805 he fought at Austerlitz, in 1806 against the Turks, and in 1807 against Napoleon at Friedland and against the Swedes in Finland.

In the war of 1812 he commanded the right wing of the Russian Army in the First and Second battle of Polotsk. This fighting decided the fate of Saint Petersburg and earned Wittgenstein the title of "Saviour of Saint-Petersburg".  Emperor Alexander I of Russia awarded him the Order of St. George. He tried to combine with Pavel Chichagov at the Battle of Berezina (November 1812), and later combined with the Prussian army corps under Ludwig Yorck von Wartenburg.

In the campaign of 1813 in January he took over the command of the Russian army after Kutuzov's death in April 1813, and commanded the Russian army at Lützen and Bautzen. But after the defeats of the Spring campaign, he laid down this command and led an army corps during the Battle of Dresden (August 1813) and the Battle of Leipzig (October 1813).

In the campaign of 1814 he led the 6th Corps under Schwarzenberg, and was severely wounded at Bar-sur-Aube (27 February 1814).

In 1823 he was promoted Field Marshal, and in 1828 he was appointed to command the Russian army in the war against Turkey. But ill-health soon obliged him to retire. In 1834 King Frederick William III of Prussia granted him the title of Fürst (Prince) zu Sayn-Wittgenstein.

Family
On 27 June 1798 he married Polish noblewoman Antonia Cäcilie Snarska and had in this marriage 11 children.
He died on 11 June 1843 in Lemberg, where he looked after estates of his son Ludwig.

References

External links

Kamenka, Wittgenstein's paradise

1769 births
1843 deaths
People from Pereiaslav
Russian commanders of the Napoleonic Wars
Russian people of the Napoleonic Wars
Field marshals of Russia
Peter
Members of the State Council (Russian Empire)
Russian people of the Kościuszko Uprising
Recipients of the Order of St. George of the Second Degree
Recipients of the Order of St. George of the Third Degree
French invasion of Russia